Street Fighter is an animated television series based on the Street Fighter video game franchise by Capcom. The series aired as part of the USA Network's Cartoon Express and Action Extreme Team lineups. It lasted two 13-episode seasons, which aired from 1995 to 1997, for a total of 26 episodes.

The show is closely based on the Street Fighter II series, but also borrows plot elements and characters from the live-action Street Fighter film and the first two Street Fighter Alpha games, as well as CP System game-based appearances such as Saturday Night Slam Masters, Magic Sword, and Final Fight.

Plot

Colonel William F. Guile is the leader of the "Street Fighters", an international undercover peacekeeping force composed of martial artists from around the world. They often face off against the ruthless General Bison and his Shadaloo criminal empire. They follow a code of honor involving the keywords "discipline", "justice" and "commitment".

Characters
 Colonel William F. Guile
 Guile is the main protagonist of the series and is depicted as the de facto leader of the "Street Fighters", a fictional peacekeeping force composed of several main characters from the games. He retains his rank and full name from the live action movie (Colonel William F. Guile). Unlike in the video games, Guile is single and has no children. He has an on-and-off relationship with an ex-girlfriend named Lucinda (an original character), and has a mutual attraction with Cammy. He appears in all Season 1 episodes and in most of Season 2.
 General M. Bison
 Like in the games, M. Bison is the ruthless and megalomaniacal ruler of Shadaloo. He serves as the main antagonist of the series.
 Chun-Li Xiang
 Chun-Li serves as the lead female character in the series and appears in most episodes like Guile. Like in the games, she seeks to avenge her father, who was killed by M. Bison. Like her movie counterpart, she also works as a news reporter.
 Carlos "Charlie" Blanka
 Like in the film, the Blanka of the TV series is Guile's combat buddy Charlie, who was turned into a mutant by Dr. Dhalsim. He temporarily reverts to his original human form in "Eye of the Beholder", where he wears an outfit similar to Charlie from the Street Fighter Alpha games, but with a green version of the same vest and still wears his shackles.
 Ken Masters
 Ken is depicted as a traveling con-man who prefers to find ways to get rich rather than helping Guile and his team. He becomes a more prominent character during the second season and is the only character in the series to defeat Akuma in "The World's Greatest Warrior".
 Ryu Hoshi
 He is portrayed as Ken's traveling partner and is depicted as the more mature and responsible one of the duo. Like Ken, he becomes more prominent during the second season and retains his rivalry with Sagat from the games. His surname is "Hoshi" in the series and he has a cousin named Sachi who appears in "The Hand That Feeds You", though he has no relatives in the games.
 Cammy White
 Cammy is portrayed as a member of Delta Red who harbors a mutual attraction with Guile. In "Chunnel Vision", she leaves Delta Red in order to become a member of Guile's team. However, she is unexpectedly brainwashed by M. Bison in "Cammy and the Bachelor", and appears through the remainder of the series as one of his agents, until her brainwashing wears off in the final episode "Cammy Tell Me True".
 E. Honda
 E. Honda is depicted as a computer whiz who loves hacking into government files while also serving as a member of the Street Fighters.
 Dee Jay
 Unlike in the film, Dee Jay is one of the heroes. He serves as the team's helicopter pilot.
 T. Hawk
 T. Hawk is a powerful flying Native-American warrior who serves as a member of the Street Fighters.
 Fei Long
 Fei Long is a martial arts movie actor who is allied with the Street Fighters.
 Dhalsim
 Dhalsim is depicted as a former scientist who retreated to the Himalayan mountains and shunned technology after being forced to experiment on Blanka by M. Bison.
 Rose 
 Like the other Alpha characters, she has a non-speaking cameo in "The Medium is the Message", but plays a major role in "The Flame and The Rose" as a mystical psychic who enlists the help of Ken and Blanka.
 Sakura Kasugano 
 Sakura appears in "Second to None" as a young Japanese girl who got into martial arts after witnessing Ryu's past fight against Sagat.
 Guy
 Guy makes a non-speaking cameo as Blanka's opponent in "The Medium is the Message", but plays a major role in "Final Fight", where he and Cody are assisted by Ryu and Ken from within their rescue mission to save Jessica from the Mad Gear Gang.
 Cody
 Cody appears in the episode "Final Fight", though he, Jessica, and many other Final Fight characters had previously made cameo appearances in the tournament audience from within "The Medium is the Message". As the episode in which he has a starring role is based on the events that took place before Street Fighter Alpha 3, Cody is shown to be in a healthy relationship with Jessica, and wears his civilian outfit from Final Fight.
 Zangief
 Zangief is depicted as one of M. Bison's recurring lackeys in the series, despite not working for him in the games. He had a similar role in the live-action film, as well as in the unrelated Japanese anime series Street Fighter II V.
 Viktor Sagat
 The second-in-command of Shadaloo. He eventually betrays M. Bison after the latter announces his plan to unleash a nuclear holocaust upon the world.
 Vega
 He appears in two episodes, "Eye of the Beholder" and "Face of Fury", both times as Blanka's rival.
 Balrog
 He makes a single appearance in "The Medium is the Message", where he ironically appears as a computer specialist working for M. Bison.
 Colonel Sawada
 He appeared twice in "Keeping the Peace" and "The Hammer Strikes" as Guile's replacement in the A.N.
 Birdie
 He is a henchman of M. Bison who plays a minor role and is beaten in a fight against Chun-Li. He appears again with a larger role in "Cammy and the Bachelor", where he works alongside Sodom.
 Adon
 Adon appears briefly in "The Medium is the Message" and has a non-speaking role as an unnamed street fighter.
 Akuma
 Akuma is the evil brother of Ryu and Ken's master, Gouken. He forces M. Bison and Guile to fight against him in "Strange Bedfellows", and later fights against both Ryu and Ken in "The World's Greatest Warrior".
 Lucinda Davila
 An expert medical scientist who serves as Guile's ex-girlfriend.
 Escher
 The head employer and liaison officer of the Street Fighters who usually contacts Guile and his team in order to give them their missions.
 Gouken	
 The master of Ryu and Ken whose chi is stolen by Akuma in "The World's Greatest Warrior". It is restored back to him by the end of the episode via Ken's victory over Akuma.
 Burke
 The leader and field commander of Delta Red who has a notable scar over his left eye.
 Rory
 A robust member of Delta Red who has both a cybernetic right eye and two cybernetic arms.
 Celia
 A beautiful yet tough-as-nails female member of Delta Red who shares a strong rivalry with Cammy.
 Jessica Haggar
 Cody's girlfriend and Haggar's daughter who is kidnapped by the Mad Gear Gang in the episode "Final Fight".
 Mike Haggar
 The Mayor of Metro City who appeared in the episode "Final Fight".
 Belger
 The main antagonist of the episode "Final Fight". He serves as the leader of the Mad Gear Gang.
 Rolento F. Schugurg
 Belger's right-hand man and second-in-command of the Mad Gear Gang in "Final Fight".
 Thrasher (originally known as Damnd in the games)
 A member of the Mad Gear Gang who helps assist Rolento in kidnapping Jessica at the start of "Final Fight".
 Sodom
 One of M. Bison's lackeys and a member of the Mad Gear Gang, he appears in "The Medium is the Message", "Cammy and the Bachelor", and "Final Fight".

Cast

Main cast
 Michael Donovan as William F. Guile, Zangief, The Crimson Crawdad
 Donna Yamamoto as Chun-Li Xiang, Jessica Haggar
 Scott McNeil as Carlos Blanka, Ken Masters, Rolento, Hugo Andore, The Great Oni, Wo Fat (Season 2), Lord Zing, Rory
 Richard Newman as M. Bison
 Tong Lung as Ryu Hoshi
 John Payne as Escher
 Paul Dobson as E. Honda, T. Hawk, Vega, Balrog, Birdie, Fei Long, Dee Jay
 Kathleen Barr as Dr. Lucinda "Cindy" Davila
 Lisa Ann Beley as Cammy White

Additional cast
 Lynda Boyd as Satin Hammer
 Jim Byrnes as Guy, Raul
 Garry Chalk as Dhalsim, Wo Fat (Season 1), Burke
 Michael Dobson as Sawada, Cody Travers, Thrasher, El Gado
 Michael Dorn as The Warrior King
 Saffron Henderson as Sakura Kasugano
 Mark Hildreth as Raymond Wang, Holly Wood, Chun-Li's father
 Janyse Jaud as Celia
 David Kaye as Akuma (Season 2)
 Blu Mankuma as Jumbo Flapjack, Sodom
 Robert O. Smith as Viktor Sagat, Gouken, Sodom, Belger
 Teryl Rothery as Rose
 Venus Terzo as La Lupa
 Alec Willows as Master Quinn, Gunloc
 Dale Wilson as Akuma (Season 1), Mike Haggar

Episodes

Season 1 (1995–96)

Season 2 (1996–97)

Crossover
Episode 22 ("The Warrior King") is part 1 of a 4-episode crossover with several other shows that aired as part of the USA "Action Extreme Team" programming block:

 Mortal Kombat: Defenders of the Realm (1996, US, animated): episode 9 "Resurrection" (Part 3)
 Savage Dragon (1995–1996, US, Canada, animated): episode 21 (208) "Endgame" (Part 2)
 Wing Commander Academy (1996, US, animated): episode 8 "Recreation" (Part 4)

This crossover event featured the Warrior King and the Orb of Power, but the principal characters of all four series don't meet each other.

Home video release
ADV Films released the complete series on Region 1 DVD. The first set, Street Fighter: Code of Honor, was released on April 13, 2003 and contains all the Season 1 episodes, while the second set, Street Fighter: Soul Powers, was released on May 13, 2003, and contains all the Season 2 episodes. Both of the DVD sets are now out of print. The "Final Fight" episode was included as unlockable content in the 2010 video game Final Fight: Double Impact. A Street Fighter 25th Anniversary Collector's Set of games, which includes a Blu-ray Disc of the entire TV series, was released in North America on September 18, 2012. Discotek Media re-released the series in 2015. In 2019, all of the Season 1 and Season 2 episodes were available on the Japanese VideoMarket website in Japan.

Reception
Despite lasting two seasons, Street Fighter has received a predominantly negative reception. 411Mania included the series in a 2010 feature titled "The 8 Worst Street Fighter Franchise Failures" on the grounds that "the animation was sub-Captain Planet, the story was contrived, and the dialogue was wretched". Nick Chester of Destructoid called the show "an abomination" and "spectacularly awful". 1UP.com labeled the series "really crappy" and added, "[w]hile SF fans love to quote the Street Fighter movie ... they are usually less enthusiastic about the Saturday morning cartoon". The site also included the series in their list of the "Top 5 Not-So-Classic Video Game Cartoons" on the basis of the plot: "Do you remember when Guile recruited every character in the game into a secret anti-terrorist paramilitary group? I don't either". While Street Fighter was omitted from GamesRadar's 2010 list of "truly horrendous" video game cartoons, it was still mentioned as "a terrible abomination that would have made our list if Darkstalkers hadn't knocked it off".

References

External links
 Episode overviews
 
 Retrojunk Streetfighter intro
 See all episodes in English at Street Fighter RPG Brazil
 

1990s American animated television series
1990s American science fiction television series
1995 American television series debuts
1997 American television series endings
1990s Canadian animated television series
1990s Canadian science fiction television series
1995 Canadian television series debuts
1997 Canadian television series endings
American television shows based on video games
Canadian television shows based on video games
Animated series based on video games
Anime-influenced Western animated television series
Martial arts television series
Street Fighter television series
USA Action Extreme Team
USA Network original programming
Works by Len Wein
Discotek Media
American children's animated action television series
American children's animated adventure television series
American children's animated science fantasy television series
Canadian children's animated action television series
Canadian children's animated adventure television series
Canadian children's animated science fantasy television series
English-language television shows
Television shows filmed in Vancouver
Television shows filmed in Los Angeles